Inanch khan or Inanch Bilge Bogü khan or Inat khan was a khan of Naimans. According to Gumilev, his Christian name was John.

Reign 
He was from the Güčügüt clan of Naimans which followed the Betegin clan. He conquered Yenisei Kyrgyz with his elder brother Naershi Tayang (納兒黑失太陽) and succeeded him later sometime. After Yelü Dashi's death 1143, he became independent. He supported Kerait ruler Toghril's brother Erke Qara against him in 1174. 

After his death Naiman khanate were divided into two factions ruled by his sons.

Family 
He was married to Gürbesu (古兒別速) and several other wives with whom he had at least two sons:

 Taibuqa, also known as Tayang khan
 Buyruq khan

Gürbesu later married to his step-son Taibuqa in a levirate marriage.

Character 
He was reported be a man of honor among Naimans according to The Secret History of the Mongols.

References 

12th-century Turkic people
Nestorians
12th-century Mongol rulers